The Best Footballer in Asia 2023, recognizing the best male footballer in Asia in 2023, is the 9th edition of the Best Footballer in Asia. Salem Al Dawsari claimed the award on 3 January 2023 It was his 1st Best Footballer in Asia,and the 1st title overall. The event was judged by a panel of 50 sports journalists.

Voting
50 judges were invited to vote, including 37 representatives from AFC nations/regions which comprise Australia, Bahrain, Bangladesh, Cambodia, China, Chinese Taipei, Hong Kong, India, Indonesia, Iran, Iraq, Japan, Jordan, Korea Republic, Kuwait, Kyrgyzstan, Lebanon, Macao, Malaysia, Mongolia, Nepal, Oman, Pakistan, Palestine, Philippines, Qatar, Saudi Arabia, Singapore, Sri Lanka, Syria, Tajikistan, Thailand, Turkmenistan, United Arabic Emirates, Uzbekistan, Vietnam and Yemen. The other thirteen jurors were independent Asian football experts or from high-profile media outlets. Before voting, all judges were given a 25-player shortlist, but could choose other eligible players.

Rules 
Each juror selects 5 best footballers and awards them 6, 4, 3, 2 and 1 point respectively from their first choice to the fifth choice. A trophy for the Best Footballer in Asia is awarded to the player with the highest total of points.

Tiebreakers
When two or more candidates obtain the same points, the rankings of the concerned candidates would be based upon the following criteria in order: 

a) The number of 1st-place vote obtained

b) The number of 2nd-place vote obtained

c) The number of 3rd-place vote obtained

d) The number of 4th-place vote obtained

If all conditions are equal, the concerned candidates tie. 

If the concerned candidates are tied for first place, the award and the trophy are shared.

Ranking
Source:

References 

2021
2021 awards
2021 in Asian football